William Rhodes (29 November 1821 – 16 February 1892) was a soldier, farmer and political figure in Quebec. He represented Mégantic in the Legislative Assembly of the Province of Canada from 1854 to 1858 as a Reformer and in the Legislative Assembly of Quebec from 1888 to 1890 as a Liberal.

He was born at Bramhope Hall Estate in Yorkshire, England, the son of William Rhodes and Ann Smith. Rhodes entered the British Army in 1838, and served in Canada East, from 1842 to 1844.

In 1847, he retired from the army as a captain and settled in Sillery, Canada East. During the same year, he married Anne Catherine Dunn, granddaughter of Thomas Dunn and Mathew Bell, at the Cathedral of the Holy Trinity in Quebec City, on 16 June. The following year, Rhodes purchased Sillery's Benmore Estate, which has been designated a component of the Sillery Heritage Site since 1964.

Rhodes was one of the founders of the Union Bank of Lower Canada. He was president of the Quebec Bridge Company, the North Shore Railway, the Quebec and Trois-Pistoles Railway, and the Quebec and Richmond Railway. Rhodes was also president of the Quebec Geographical Society, a justice of the peace, and a lieutenant in the militia. He served in the Quebec cabinet as Commissioner of Agriculture and Colonization. Rhodes was defeated when he ran for reelection in 1890. William Rhodes died at his residence of the Benmore Estate in Sillery, at the age of 70.

References

1821 births
1892 deaths
People from Bramhope
English emigrants to pre-Confederation Quebec
Anglophone Quebec people
Burials at Mount Hermon Cemetery
Canadian justices of the peace
Members of the Legislative Assembly of the Province of Canada from Canada East
Quebec Liberal Party MNAs
Military personnel from Leeds